Ahmadi District is a district (bakhsh) in Hajjiabad County, Hormozgan Province, Iran. At the 2006 census, its population was 10,808, in 2,571 families.  The District is entirely rural. The District has two rural districts (dehestan): Ahmadi Rural District and Kuh Shah Rural District.

References 

Districts of Hormozgan Province
Hajjiabad County